Silva Hakobyan (born October 23, 1988) is an Armenian singer. She rose to fame after winning the competition for the "Next Big Thing" presented by BBC.

Early life
Hakobyan was born on October 23, 1988, in the city of Vayk, Vayots Dzor. She performed since the age of four.

Career
Silva's song "I Like" was composed by her sister Mane and produced by her brother Edgar, the song participated in London in the BBC "The Next Big Thing" global competition and among around 2000 participants, by the decision of world known members of jury was awarded the grand prize. According to the BBC rating, Silva was named the best young singer in the world.

Discography

Studio albums
Tnic Pakhel Em (2008)
Siloi (2010)
Dochka (2019)

Compilation albums
Gold Collection (2016)

References

External links
Official web site

Armenian Apostolic Christians
21st-century Armenian women singers
1988 births
Living people
Armenian pop singers